Lecithocera distigmatella is a moth in the family Lecithoceridae. It was described by Zeller in 1877. It is found in Australia.

References

Moths described in 1877
distigmatella